Melvin Morris (born January 7, 1942) is a United States Army veteran of the Vietnam War, a Special Forces soldier, and a recipient of the Medal of Honor.

Early life, Military Career, Later Life

Morris was born in Okmulgee, Oklahoma, on January 7, 1942. In 1959 Morris joined the Oklahoma Army National Guard and soon after joined the active duty United States Army. 

In 1961, Morris became one of the first US Army soldiers to qualify as a Green Beret at Fort Bragg, North Carolina. He twice volunteered for tours in South Vietnam.

Morris retired from the US Army with the rank of Sergeant First Class.  

Morris appeared in the Spring 2019 issue of the American Battlefield Trust's magazine Hallowed Ground, writing about his visit to Fort Wagner, near Charleston, South Carolina, where Sergeant William Harvey Carney earned his Medal of Honor while serving with the 54th Massachusetts in 1863.

In December 1990, Morris and his family settled in Brevard County, Florida.

Medal of Honor action
Morris received the Medal of Honor for his valorous actions on September 17, 1969, while commanding the Third Company, Third Battalion of the IV Mobile Strike Force near Chi Lăng, South Vietnam. Then-Staff Sergeant Morris led an advance across enemy lines to recover the body of a fallen sergeant. Morris single-handedly destroyed with a bag of grenades an enemy force in a series of bunkers which was pinning down his battalion.  Morris was shot three times during that engagement. 

Morris received the Medal of Honor from President Barack Obama in a March 18, 2014 ceremony in the White House. The award came through the Defense Authorization Act, which called for a congressionally-mandated review of minorities including Jewish American and Hispanic American veterans from World War II, the Korean War and the Vietnam War to ensure that no prejudice was shown to those deserving the Medal of Honor.

Medal of Honor Citation

'''

Other awards
SFC Morris' awards include:

References

1942 births
Living people
United States Army personnel of the Vietnam War
People from Brevard County, Florida
Recipients of the Air Medal
United States Army Medal of Honor recipients
United States Army soldiers
Vietnam War recipients of the Medal of Honor
Oklahoma National Guard personnel
Members of the United States Army Special Forces